The 2018–19 Premier League Tournament Tier B was the second division of the 31st season of first-class cricket in Sri Lanka's Premier Trophy. The tournament was contested by nine teams, starting on 31 January 2019 and concluding on 23 May 2019. Negombo Cricket Club won the tournament in the previous season and were promoted to Tier A. They were replaced in Tier B by Bloomfield Cricket and Athletic Club after their relegation from Tier A.

Lankan Cricket Club won the tournament and secured promotion to Tier A, after finishing top of the points table ahead of Sri Lanka Navy Sports Club.

Points table

 Promoted to Tier A

Matches

Round 1

Round 2

Round 3

Round 4

Round 5

Round 6

Round 7

Round 8

Round 9

Round 10

Round 11

See also
 2018–19 Premier League Tournament Tier A

References

External links
 Series home at ESPN Cricinfo

Premier League Tournament Tier B
Premier League Tournament Tier B